The massacre at 111 Marszałkowska Street - a crime against the civilian population of Warsaw committed by the Germans during the Warsaw Uprising. On August 3, 1944, next to the "Pod Światełkami" tavern, the crew of a German armoured car shot about 30-44 Polish civilians - residents of tenement houses on Marszałkowska Street No. 109, 111, 113.

The massacre 
During the first days of August 1944, the section of Marszałkowska Street enclosed by Chmielna and Złota Streets was not overtaken by major insurgent fights. On August 3, around 11:00 a.m., a German armored car arrived there and started shooting at surrounding houses while driving north on Marszałkowska Street. The vehicle then stopped in front of tenement house no. 113, where a small group of soldiers got out. They entered the courtyard of the tenement house and then went to the grounds of the neighbouring house number 111. According to Piotr Grzywacz, an inhabitant of that house, the unit consisted of one German and eight "Ukrainians" dressed in SS uniforms. In the report of the commander of the Warsaw District of the Home Army, General Albin Skroczyński, pseudonym "Łaszcz", six soldiers, mostly Ukrainians, were mentioned. ('Situation report No 5 on the German repression of civilians in the Jerozolimskie Avenue region', 4 August 1944).

The SS men ordered the inhabitants to go to the courtyard immediately (the order was issued in German, Polish and "Russian"). About 40 people listened to the order. The soldiers gathered everyone in front of the "Pod Światełkami" tavern and shot them with machine guns. It is not entirely clear how many civilians fell victims to this execution. In the "Łaszcz" report there was a reference to 20-30 murdered people. According to Piotr Grzywacz, there were 37 victims. Maja Motyl and Stanisław Rutkowski, authors of the study "Warsaw Uprising - the register of places and facts of crime", assessed the number of people killed at 44. The victims of the massacre were residents of houses at Marszałkowska Street: 109, 111, 113. Women and children were among the murdered.

After the murder, the German sub-unit tried to leave the tenement house, but it was prevented from doing so by insurgent fire from the "Metropol" hotel building. (Marszałkowska St., corner of Złota St.). The Germans stayed in the house for the next day. On August 4, an assault section from the staff unit of the Warsaw Home Army District broke into the tenement house, where they captured two "Ukrainians", the remaining SS men were killed during the exchange of fire. The prisoners confessed to carrying out the murder of civilians, claiming that they were following orders of their commanding officer, a German. They were both shot after the interrogation.

Notes

References 

August 1944 events
Massacres in 1944
Nazi war crimes during the Warsaw Uprising